Mads Kaalund Larsen (born 16 August 1996) is a Danish professional footballer who plays for Silkeborg IF.

References

Living people
1996 births
Association football midfielders
Danish men's footballers
Lyngby Boldklub players
Nykøbing FC players
Silkeborg IF players
Danish Superliga players
Danish 1st Division players
Akademisk Boldklub players
Denmark youth international footballers
Footballers from Copenhagen